Daira may refer to:

 Daïra, a type of administrative division in parts of West Africa and Southeast Asia
 Daira (crab), a genus of crabs in the family Dairidae
 Da'ira (talisman), a circular talisman used in Bábism
 Da'ira, Yemen, a populated place on the island of Socotra
 Daeira or Daira, one of the Oceanids in Greek mythology
 Ali Daïra (born 1981), Algerian footballer
 Daira, a 2001 Urdu novel by Muhammad Asim Butt
 Alternative spelling of Dayereh, a type of drum

See also